is a town located on Tokunoshima, in Ōshima District, Kagoshima Prefecture, Japan.

As of June 2013, the town has an estimated population of 11,673 and a population density of 111 persons per km². The total area is 104.87  km².

Geography
Tokunoshima occupies the northeastern portion of the island of Tokunoshima, with the Pacific Ocean to the east.

The town as a governmental entity comprises several districts containing a variety of villages and one larger town. This town, generally referred to as Kametsu, is focused around the district of the same name and the neighboring port of Kametoku. Kametsu is the main center of commerce and services on the island.

Towns and Villages
Boma
Inokawa
Kametoku
Kametsu
Kaminomine
Kanami
Kedoku
Omo
San
Shimokushi
Shirai
Shoda
Tete
Todoroki
Tokuwase

Surrounding municipalities
Isen
Amagi

Climate
The climate is classified as humid subtropical (Köppen climate classification Cfa) with very warm summers and mild winters(average temperature ). Precipitation is high throughout the year, but is highest in the months of May, June and September. Because of its climate, tropical and sub-tropical fruits are in abundance.

History
On 1 April 1908 Kametsu Village was founded. It was upgraded to town status on January 1, 1942. As with all of Tokunoshima, the town came under the administration of the United States from 1 July 1946 to 25 December 1953.  On 1 April 1958, Kametsu merged with the neighboring village of Higashi-Amagi, and was renamed Tokunoshima.

Transportation
Kametoku Port

Noted people from Tokunoshima
Kyokudōzan Kazuyasu – sumo wrestler
Ichinoya Mitsuru – sumo wrestler

External links

Tokunoshima official website 

Towns in Kagoshima Prefecture 
Populated coastal places in Japan